Nancy Haberland (born August 16, 1960) is an American sailor. She competed in the Yngling event at the 2004 Summer Olympics.

References

External links
 

1960 births
Living people
American female sailors (sport)
Olympic sailors of the United States
Sailors at the 2004 Summer Olympics – Yngling
Sportspeople from Evanston, Illinois
21st-century American women